Nationality words link to articles with information on the nation's poetry or literature (for instance, Irish or France).

Events

Works published in English

United Kingdom
 Matthew Arnold, Essays in Criticism, First Series, including "The Function of Criticism at the Present Time"
 Robert Browning, Poetical Works: Fourth Edition
 Robert Williams Buchanan, "The Session of the Poets," an attack on Algernon Charles Swinburne, published in The Spectator
 Lewis Carroll, Alice's Adventures in Wonderland, children's novel, including the prefatory poem "All in the golden afternoon..." and a number of nonsense verses
 Arthur Hugh Clough, Letters and Remains of Arthur Hugh Clough, including Dipsychus (see also Poems and Prose 1869), posthumously published
 Samuel Ferguson, Lays of the Western Gael
 Mary Wright Sewell, Mother's Last Words: a ballad
 Algernon Charles Swinburne:
 Atalanta in Calydon
 Chastelard

United States
 Thomas Bailey Aldrich, Poems
 Fitz-Greene Halleck, Young America: A Poem
 Oliver Wendell Holmes, Humorous Poems
 George Moses Horton, Naked Genius; this year, Horton, a slave, gains his liberty, publishes the book in Raleigh, North Carolina, and moves to Philadelphia
 Henry Wadsworth Longfellow:
 Translator, The Divine Comedy of Dante Alighieri, two volumes (Volume 2 in 1867)
 Household Poems
 James Russell Lowell, Ode Recited at the Commemoration of the Living and Dead Soldiers of Harvard University
 John Godfrey Saxe, Clever Stories of Many Nations Rendered in Rhyme
 Richard Henry Stoddard, Abraham Lincoln: An Horation Ode
 Samuel Ward, Lyrical Recreations
 Walt Whitman:
 Drum-Taps, a collection of poems on the American Civil War, published in April
 Sequel to Drum-Taps, a collection of 18 poems mourning the assassination of Abraham Lincoln, including "O Captain! My Captain!" and "When Lilacs Last in the Dooryard Bloom'd", published in Autumn

Other in English
 Charles Harpur, The Tower of a Dream, verse pamphlet, Australia
 Charles Heavysege, Jephthah's Daughter, Canada

Works published in other languages
 Giosuè Carducci, "Inno a Satana", Italy
 Victor Hugo, Les Chansons des rues et des bois, France
 Pamphile Lemay, Essais poétiques; French language; Canada
 Uilleam Mac Dhun Lèibhe (William Livingston), Duain agus Orain, collection, Scottish Gaelic poet published in Scotland
 Sully Prudhomme, Stances et poèmes, France
 Rimes et Poësies Jersiaises, Jersey

Births
Death years link to the corresponding "[year] in poetry" article:
 March – Edward Dyson (died 1931), Australian
 March 20 – Arthur Bayldon (died 1958), Australian
 March 23 – Madison Cawein (died 1914), American
 March 27 – Marion Angus (died 1946), Scots language poet
 April 9 – Adela Florence Nicolson, née Cory ("Lawrence Hope"; died 1904), English
 May 2 – William Gay (died 1897), Scottish-born Australian
 May 5 – Helen Maud Merrill (died 1943), American
 May 15 – Albert Verwey (died 1937), Dutch
 May 20 – Henry Ernest Boote (died 1949), English-born Australian
 June 13 – W. B. Yeats (died 1939), Irish poet and playwright
 July 18 – Dowell O'Reilly (died 1923), Australian
 July 21 (or 1868?) – Thomas William Hodgson Crosland (died 1924), English writer and poet
 September 12 – Sophus Claussen (died 1931), Danish
 September 21 – Francis Kenna (died 1932), Australian
 December 30
Rudyard Kipling (died 1936), Indian-born English novelist, writer and poet
Emily Julian McManus (died 1918), Canadian poet, author, and educator
 Also:
 Kunjikuttan Thampuran (died 1913), Indian, Malayalam-language poet
 Samuel Williamson (died 1936), Australian

Deaths
Birth years link to the corresponding "[year] in poetry" article:
 May 1 – Isaac Williams (born 1802), English writer, poet and clergyman
 June 10 – Mrs. Lydia Sigourney, the "Sweet Singer of Hartford" (born 1791), American
 August 4 – William Edmondstoune Aytoun (born 1813), Scottish lawyer and poet
 September 29 – Richard Lower (born 1782), English dialect poet
 October 15 – Andrés Bello (born 1781), Venezuelan humanist, diplomat, poet, legislator, philosopher, educator and philologist
 November 9 – George Arnold (born 1834), American writer, poet and artist

See also

 19th century in poetry
 19th century in literature
 List of years in poetry
 List of years in literature
 Victorian literature
 French literature of the 19th century
 Poetry

Notes

Poetry
19th-century poetry